CKOB (originally part of Opeongo Broadcasting) radio located in Renfrew, Ontario, Canada, broadcast on 1400 kHz until the later half of 1996 using a non-directional 1,000-watt circular beam antenna.

The station was launched in 1974. The three original founders of CKOB were Marty Burns, Terry Sammon and James Donnohue. CKOB was sold to Jamie Pole in 1981.

Richard Armitage (program director) managed early 1980s announcers such as Bob Rose (sports director), Rick Niemi (music director), Gerard "Gerry" Gava and Brother Lee Nelson as they entertained the Ottawa Valley region with an assortment of cross-country, middle-of-the-road and adult contemporary music. The station was semi-automated between midnight and six in the morning playing back pre-recorded music from a simple reel-to-reel logger machine running at 3/32 inches per second.

Live local lunch time phone-in shows such as In the Mayor's Chair, hosted by then news director Terry Horner or Derek Neil put the listener directly in touch with the presiding mayor (Audrey Green) in an open forum to discuss topics of the day. Cathy Warren hosted the daily talk show.

In 1984, Jamie Pole launched sister station CKOA in Arnprior, with 250 watts, and one of the most modern solid state transmitters available at the time. The transmitter was the first of its type to be used in the Ottawa Valley and was 100% Canadian made. Peter DeWolf managed the new Arnprior station. The two station POLE network was then known "Ottawa Valley Radio".

Ottawa Valley Radio, including CKOB in Renfrew and CKOA in Arnprior, was sold by then-owner Jamie Pole in 1991 to Annapolis Valley Radio Ltd. In their decision, the Canadian Radio-television and Telecommunications Commission (CRTC) believed this transaction would provide the stations a new opportunity for growth and community involvement. Unfortunately they also permitted the reduction of locally produced programming from 126 to 21 hours per week. Eventually Pelmorex acquired CKOB and CKOA, both of which were converted to rebroadcasters of CHRO in Pembroke.

CHVR moved to FM in 1996. Due to its signal strength, the Renfrew and Arnprior rebroadcasters were both discontinued. Local programming was also discontinued in both communities. No doubt feeling the backlash against these decisions, in 2004 the CRTC approved a new FM licensed station in Renfrew, Ontario to Jamie Pole's son, Jon Pole. Jon Pole, served as president of the new company along with business partner Andrew Dickson. Owned by My Broadcasting Corporation, with its first station in Renfrew, Ontario, their radio network now includes Pembroke, Arnprior, Napanee, Brighton, Gananoque, Strathroy, St. Thomas, Goderich, Kincardine, Saugeen Shores, Exeter, Simcoe, Cobourg, Peterborough, Alliston, Orangeville and Milton. The new stations involve several of the same broadcasters as Ottawa Valley Radio, including Bob Rose, Rob Mise, Peter DeWolf, Andrew Dickson and others.

External links
 
Decision CRTC 85-424
Decision CRTC 86-917
Decision CRTC 86-919
Decision CRTC 90-987
Decision CRTC 90-1053

Kob
Kob
Radio stations established in 1973
1973 establishments in Ontario
1996_disestablishments_in_Ontario 
Radio_stations_disestablished_in_1996
KOB (AM)